The 2012 IQA World Cup, known at the time as the Summer Games, was the first edition of this national teams international championship. It was played at Cutteslowe Park and South Park in Oxford, United Kingdom. The Cup was scheduled to coincide with the arrival of the 2012 Summer Olympics torch. The United States won the tournament 160*–0 to France in the final. An exhibition match was also played on Monday, July 9 between the United States and the United Kingdom as part of the official Oxford Olympic torch ceremony.

Participating teams

Group stage

Bracket phase

References

External links
Video stream of the tournament
International Quidditch Association

2012
2012 in British sport
Sport in Oxford
July 2012 sports events in the United Kingdom